The Type 32 frigate is a frigate currently in development in the United Kingdom for the Royal Navy. It was officially announced in November 2020 by Prime Minister Boris Johnson as a result of the Integrated Review. Built after the Type 26 and Type 31 frigates, the ship will be general-purpose and modular in its design and, after entering service in the 2030s, is expected to help grow the Royal Navy's surface escort fleet from 19 to 24 vessels.

Development
The ship was first announced by Prime Minister Boris Johnson on 19 November 2020 as part of a defence investment pledge ahead of the Integrated Review. In addition to the long-known Type 26 and Type 31 frigates, the Prime Minister announced a new Type 32 frigate would be built. On 30 November 2020, the Ministry of Defence stated that the concept phase for the vessel had not yet been launched but added that the ship was envisioned as a "platform for autonomous systems", used in roles such as anti-submarine warfare and mine countermeasures. Like the Type 31 frigate, the ship will be general-purpose in its design. Up to five ships are planned, which, in combination with the planned five Type 31 frigates and eight Type 26 frigates, will grow the Royal Navy's surface escort fleet from 19 to 24 vessels.

In March 2021, the government's defence command paper, Defence in a Competitive Age, elaborated further on the Type 32 frigate stating that it would be designed to protect territorial waters, to provide persistent presence and to support the Royal Navy's new Littoral Response Groups (LRGs). The document also stated that, along with the Type 31, the frigates would be more flexible than their predecessors, featuring a modular design, and equipped with advanced sensors and weapons. According to the document, the ships are likely to be built at Scottish shipyards, like the Type 26 and Type 31.

In November 2021, Royal Navy First Sea Lord Tony Radakin announced that the ship had entered its concept phase. He added that it was too early to define its characteristics but being a "Type 31 Batch 2" frigate could be an option. Radakin also reiterated the intent of the programme to provide "additional volume" to the fleet and embrace emerging technology. The revised National Shipbuilding Strategy, released in March 2022, suggested that  the Type 32 frigates were likely to be "the first of a new generation of warships with a focus on hosting and operating autonomous onboard systems". Earlier comments by the UK's Minister for Defense Procurement, Jeremy Quin, also suggested that the new Type 32 frigate will be a platform for autonomous systems, adding to the Royal Navy's capabilities for missions such as anti-submarine warfare and mine countermeasures.

In November 2022, the National Audit Office reported that plans for the Type 32 frigate had been withdrawn by Navy Command due to concerns about unaffordability. Despite this, the MOD stated that the ships remained a key part of the future fleet. 

In January 2023, Defence Secretary of the United Kingdom Ben Wallace reported that the Type 32 frigate was still planned for implementation after "2030 or 2031", with further planning considerations to be addressed "between now and towards the centre of the decade."

See also
 Future of the Royal Navy

References

Frigate classes
Ship classes of the Royal Navy
Proposed ships of the Royal Navy
United Kingdom defence procurement